Scythris scyphella is a moth of the family Scythrididae. It was described by Bengt Å. Bengtsson in 2002. It is found in Yemen.

The wingspan is 5–8 mm.

References

scyphella
Moths described in 2002